Helvick or Helvick Head is a headland on the southern end of Dungarvan Harbour, Ireland; it is the eastern tip of the Ring Peninsula.

Formed of Old Red Sandstone, it is the easternmost protrusion of a ridge that begins near Cork City.

Name

Helvick is one of a very few Irish place names derived from Old Norse. The second part, -vík, means "bay" (cf. Smerwick); and -hel in Icelandic means death or danger. (See the Icelandic adjective helvískur which means dangerous). Helvik would be recognised by an Icelander as suggesting a dangerous harbour entrance, especially in view of the presence of the very dangerous Blackrock right in the entrance to Dungarvan Harbour and just over a mile from the headland of Helvick.   

the meaning of the first part is unclear, but it may mean "healthy", "white", "holy", or "safe"; compare with Hellvik, Norway.

Wildlife

Helvick Head is a Special Area of Conservation (SAC). The cliffs are a nesting site for seabirds including choughs and shag. Other bird species include razorbill, Northern fulmar, peregrine falcon, black-legged kittiwake, black guillemot, and common murre (guillemot).

Plants include gorse, bell heather, ling, devil's-bit scabious, heath bedstraw, bog violet, burnet rose, thrift, kidney vetch, sea mayweed and wild carrot.

References

Headlands of County Waterford